Steven Moreira (born 13 August 1994) is a French professional footballer who plays as a right-back for Columbus Crew in Major League Soccer.

Club career
A Rennes youth exponent, Moreira joined FC Lorient on 30 August 2016 signing a four year deal. He scored his first professional goal against RC Lens in the second round of the Coupe de la Ligue.

Moreira was transferred to Toulouse on 10 August 2018 and agreed to terms on a three year deal.

In August 2021, Moreira signed with Columbus Crew on a free transfer, with team options to extend his contract until the end of the 2023 season.

On 27 August 2022, Moreira scored his first goal for the Crew, a right footed volley in the 96th minute to tie Hell is Real rivals FC Cincinnati 2–2.

International career
He is a former France youth international. He played at the 2013 UEFA European Under-19 European Championship, finishing as the runner-up.

Honours
Columbus Crew
 Campeones Cup: 2021

References

External links
 
 
 
 Eurosport profile
 

1994 births
Living people
French footballers
French sportspeople of Cape Verdean descent
France under-21 international footballers
France youth international footballers
Association football fullbacks
Columbus Crew players
FC Lorient players
Ligue 1 players
Ligue 2 players
Major League Soccer players
People from Noisy-le-Grand
Footballers from Seine-Saint-Denis
Stade Rennais F.C. players
Toulouse FC players
US Torcy players